Foolish Happiness (German: Das närrische Glück) is a 1929 German silent film directed by Johannes Guter and Rudolf Walther-Fein and starring Fritz Kampers, Livio Pavanelli and Margarete Kupfer.

The film's sets were designed by Botho Hoefer and Hans Minzloff.

Cast
In alphabetical order
 Valeria Blanka 
 Gustav Czimeg 
 Bruno Eichgrün 
 Robert Garrison 
 Paul Henckels 
 Fritz Kampers 
 Irene Krauß 
 Margarete Kupfer 
 Eberhard Leithoff 
 Maria Paudler 
 Livio Pavanelli 
 Hermann Picha 
 Karl Platen 
 Otto Wallburg 
 Emmy Wyda

References

Bibliography
 Gerhard Lamprecht. Deutsche Stummfilme: 1927-1931.

External links

1929 films
Films of the Weimar Republic
German silent feature films
Films directed by Rudolf Walther-Fein
Films directed by Johannes Guter
German black-and-white films